= Paul Ramchandani =

Professor of play at the University of Cambridge

Paul G. Ramchandani is a British consultant child and adolescent psychiatrist, and the first LEGO Professor of Play in Education, Development and Learning at the University of Cambridge, appointed in January 2018.

Ramchandani is Professor of Child and Adolescent Mental Health at Imperial College London, and works as a consultant child and adolescent psychiatrist in the NHS with CNWL NHS Foundation Trust.

== Selected publications ==
- Barker B, Iles JE, Ramchandani PG, 2017, Fathers, fathering and child psychopathology, Current Opinion in Psychology, Vol:15, ISSN 2352-250X, Pages:87-92
- Iles JE, Rosan C, Wilkinson E, et al., 2017, Adapting and developing a video-feedback intervention for co-parents of infants at risk of externalising behaviour problems (VIPP-Co): A feasibility study., Clin Child Psychol Psychiatry
- Marcano Belisario JS, Doherty K, O'Donoghue J, et al., 2017, A bespoke mobile application for the longitudinal assessment of depression and mood during pregnancy: protocol of a feasibility study., Bmj Open, Vol:7
- Marcano-Belisario JS, Gupta AK, O'Donoghue J, et al., 2017, Implementation of depression screening in antenatal clinics through tablet computers: results of a feasibility study, Bmc Medical Informatics and Decision Making, Vol:17, ISSN 1472-6947
- Sethna V, Perry E, Domoney J, et al., 2017, FATHER-CHILD INTERACTIONS AT 3 MONTHS AND 24 MONTHS: CONTRIBUTIONS TO CHILDREN'S COGNITIVE DEVELOPMENT AT 24 MONTHS., Infant Ment Health J, Vol:38, Pages:378-390
